The 1954 Rollins Tars baseball team represented Rollins College in the 1954 NCAA baseball season. The Tars were coached by Joe Justice in his 8th season at Rollins.

The Tars lost the College World Series, defeated by the Missouri Tigers in the championship game.

Roster

Schedule 

! style="" | Regular Season
|- valign="top"  

|- align="center" bgcolor=ccffcc
|  || Harper-Shepherd Field • Winter Park, FL || W 1–0 || 1–0
|- align="center" bgcolor=ffbbb
| North Carolina || Harper-Shepherd Field • Winter Park, FL || L 0–3 || 1–1
|- align="center" bgcolor=ccffcc
|  || Harper-Shepherd Field • Winter Park, FL || W 5–1 || 2–1
|- align="center" bgcolor=ffbbb
|  || Harper-Shepherd Field • Winter Park, FL || L 5–8 || 2–2
|- align="center" bgcolor=ccffcc
|  || Harper-Shepherd Field • Winter Park, FL || W 6–5 || 3–2
|- align="center" bgcolor=ffbbb
| Ohio State || Harper-Shepherd Field • Winter Park, FL || L 1–2 || 3–3
|- align="center" bgcolor=ccffcc
| Georgia Tech || Harper-Shepherd Field • Winter Park, FL || W 6–5 || 4–3
|- align="center" bgcolor=ccffcc
|  || Harper-Shepherd Field • Winter Park, FL || W 3–0 || 5–3
|- align="center" bgcolor=ccffcc
| Ohio State || Harper-Shepherd Field • Winter Park, FL || W 6–4 || 6–3
|-

|- align="center" bgcolor=ccffcc
|  ||  || W 5–2 || 7–3
|- align="center" bgcolor=ccffcc
| Florida ||  || W 11–9 || 8–3
|- align="center" bgcolor=ccffcc
|  ||  || W 8–7 || 9–3
|- align="center" bgcolor=ccffcc
| Miami (FL) ||  || W 6–1 || 10–3
|- align="center" bgcolor=ccffcc
|  ||  || W 7–1 || 11–3
|- align="center" bgcolor=ffbbb
|  ||  || L 4–6 || 11–4
|- align="center" bgcolor=ccffcc
|  ||  || W 19–0 || 12–4
|- align="center" bgcolor=ccffcc
| Centre ||  || W 12–8 || 13–4
|- align="center" bgcolor=ccffcc
| Tampa ||  || W 20–0 || 14–4
|- align="center" bgcolor=ccffcc
|  ||  || W 9–3 || 15–4
|- align="center" bgcolor=ccffcc
| Florida Southern ||  || W 16–1 || 16–4
|- align="center" bgcolor=ccffcc
|  ||  || W 4–1 || 17–4
|- align="center" bgcolor=ccffcc
| Stetson ||  || W 6–5 || 18–4
|- align="center" bgcolor=ffbbb
| Miami (FL) ||  || L 2–4 || 18–5
|- align="center" bgcolor=ccffcc
| Miami (FL) ||  || W 6–3 || 19–5
|- align="center" bgcolor=ccffcc
| Stetson ||  || W 4–1 || 20–5
|- align="center" bgcolor=ccffcc
| Stetson ||  || W 6–5 || 21–5
|-

|-
! style="" | Postseason
|-

|- align="center" bgcolor="#ccffcc"
| vs  || Harper-Shepherd Field • Winter Park, FL || W 3–0 || 21–6
|- align="center" bgcolor="#ccffcc"
| vs VPI || Harper-Shepherd Field • Winter Park, FL || W 9–3 || 22–6
|-

|- align="center" bgcolor="#ccffcc"
| June 10 || vs  || Rosenblatt Stadium • Omaha, NE || W 9–5 || 23–6 || 1–0
|- align="center" bgcolor="#ccffcc"
| June 11 || vs Missouri || Rosenblatt Stadium • Omaha, NE || W 4–1 || 24–6 || 2–0
|- align="center" bgcolor="#ccffcc"
| June 12 || vs Michigan State || Rosenblatt Stadium • Omaha, NE || W 5–4 || 25–6 || 3–0
|- align="center" bgcolor="#ffcccc"
| June 13 || vs Michigan State || Rosenblatt Stadium • Omaha, NE || L 2–3 || 25–7 || 3–1
|- align="center" bgcolor="#ffcccc"
| June 16 || vs Missouri || Rosenblatt Stadium • Omaha, NE || L 1–4 || 25–8 || 3–2
|-

References 

Rollins
Rollins Tars baseball seasons
College World Series seasons
Rollins Tars